Jelle is a Dutch male given name, rarely also given to women.

The origin of the name lies in Friesland, although the name is quite commonly used throughout the Netherlands and Flanders. The name comes from the Dutch word "geld", more probable the Frisian word "jild", meaning "money", "value", "payment", "revenge", or "festival of sacrifice". In the southern Netherlands, Jelle is also an abbreviation for Willem.

People 
Jelle Bakker (born 1983) International Dutch Youtuber and artist
Jelle De Beule (born 1980), Belgian comedian
Jelle de Bock (born 1988), Belgian football player
Jelle Taeke de Boer (1908–1970), Dutch art collector
Jelle Faber (1924–2004), Canadian theologian
Jelle Florizoone (born 1995), Belgian actor
Jelle Goes (born 1970), Dutch football manager
Jelle Klaasen (born 1984), Dutch darts player
Jelle Nijdam (born 1963), Dutch cyclist
Jelle Reyners (1600–1634), Dutch painter
Jelle ten Rouwelaar (born 1980), Dutch football player
Jelle Van Dael (born 1990), Belgian singer
Jelle Van Damme (born 1983), Belgian football player
Jelle van Gorkom (born 1991), Dutch cyclist
Jelle van Kruijssen (born 1989), Dutch football player
Jelle Vanendert (born 1985), Belgian cyclist
Jelle Vossen (born 1989), Belgian football player
Jelle Wagenaar (born 1989), Dutch football player
Jelle Wallays (born 1989), Belgian cyclist
Jelle Zijlstra (1918–2001), Dutch politician and Prime Minister

Unisex given names
Dutch masculine given names